Poliodule xanthodelta is a moth in the subfamily Arctiinae. It was described by Oswald Bertram Lower in 1897. It is found in Australia.

References

Moths described in 1897
Lithosiini